Allah Haqq (also Romanized as Allāh Ḩaqq and Allāh Ḩaq) is a village in Howmeh Rural District, in the Central District of Sarab County, East Azerbaijan Province, Iran. At the 2006 census, its population was 218, in 45 families.

References 

Populated places in Sarab County